The 1907 LSU Tigers football team represented the LSU Tigers of Louisiana State University during the 1907 Southern Intercollegiate Athletic Association football season. The season was the first year under coach Edgar Wingard.  It was also the first year at LSU for star player, Doc Fenton.

Before the season
Fenton, who was from Scranton, Pennsylvania, had been heavily recruited by Wingard to play at LSU.

Schedule

Game summaries

Louisiana Industrial
The Tigers opened the season at State Field, by beating Louisiana Industrial, 28–0.  A highlight of that game was a 90-yard touchdown run by Doc Fenton. It was Louisiana Industrial's only loss on the season.

Texas and Texas A&M
This win was followed by losses on the road at Texas and Texas A&M.  After these losses, LSU went on to win 4 straight games.

Howard
The Tigers romped over Howard 57–0.

Arkansas
The 17–12  win over Arkansas was the school's first over the school.

Alabama
That 4 game winning streak was broken by a loss to Alabama.  In the contest against Alabama, LSU led for most of the game because of two safeties.  Alabama scored late in the game from an 85-yard punt return to win the game 6–4.

Baylor
LSU's next game resulted in a win over Baylor.

Bacardi Bowl

Their last game of the season was in an appearance at the Bacardi Bowl. This was LSU's first bowl game, and the first time any U.S. football team played in a foreign country.

This game, played in Cuba against the University of Havana resulted in a 56–0 victory for LSU.

References

LSU
LSU Tigers football seasons
College football undefeated seasons
LSU Tigers football